Xiong Fengshan (born 15 October 1963) is a Chinese judoka. He competed in the men's lightweight event at the 1988 Summer Olympics.

References

1963 births
Living people
Chinese male judoka
Olympic judoka of China
Judoka at the 1988 Summer Olympics
Sportspeople from Beijing
20th-century Chinese people